Llanelli Town Hall is a municipal building in Church Street, Llanelli, Carmarthenshire, South Wales. The town hall, which was the headquarters of Llanelli Borough Council, is a Grade II listed building.

History
In the 18th century the portreeve and burgesses of Llanelli met in the Falcon Inn in Thomas Street. The first purpose-built town hall in Llanelli, which was designed with arcading on the ground floor to allow markets to be held and with an assembly room on the first floor, was erected in Hall Street in 1827. A local board of health was established in 1850 which decided in the early 1890s to procure a new town hall: the site they selected s open land to the west of Church Street. Following significant population growth, largely associated with the coal mining and iron working industries, the area became an urban district in 1894.

The new building was the subject of a design competition, which was adjudicated by Charles Barry Jr.; however, the winning design was shelved in preference to the design of a local architect, Williams Griffiths. It was designed in the Italianate style, was built by a local contractor, T. P. Jones, in rubble stone with Bath stone dressings and was opened on 31 March 1896. The design involved a symmetrical main frontage with seven bays facing onto Church Street with the last two bays at each end projected forwards; the central section of three bays, which was taller than the other sections, featured a porch with Doric order pilasters supporting an entablature and a pediment with the head of a lion in the tympanum and a statue of justice flanked by lions above; there were tall round headed windows on the first floor flanked by Corinthian order pilasters supporting a cornice with modillions and a balustrade. There was a clock tower with an octagonal cupola at roof level. Internally, the principal room was the council chamber.

A war memorial intended to commemorate the lives of local service personnel who died in the Second Boer War was unveiled by Field Marshal Lord Roberts on 26 August 1905. The area was advanced to a municipal borough with the town hall as its headquarters in 1913. Meanwhile, a war memorial designed by Sir William Goscombe John intended to commemorate the lives of local service personnel who died in the First World War was unveiled by the former General Officer Commanding 53rd (Welsh) Infantry Division, Major-General Stanley Mott, on 27 October 1923.

The town hall continued to serve as the borough headquarters for much of the 20th century and, from 1974, as the headquarters of the enlarged Llanelli District Council. An office block, designed by the council architects' department, was built to the south of the town hall to accommodate council officers and their departments; it was officially opened as Ty Elwyn, named after the former Lord Chancellor, Lord Elwyn-Jones, in 1981.

The town hall ceased to be local seat of government when Carmarthenshire County Council became the unitary authority for the area in 1996. A plaque to commemorate the life of Sergeant Ivor Rees of the 11th Battalion, South Wales Borderers, who was awarded the Victoria Cross for his bravery at the Battle of Passchendaele during the First World War, was unveiled at the town hall on 31 July 2007.

References

Government buildings completed in 1896
City and town halls in Wales
Buildings and structures in Llanelli
Grade II listed buildings in Carmarthenshire